Waukesha may refer to:

Places
United States 
Waukesha County, Wisconsin
 Waukesha County Airport
Waukesha, Wisconsin, a city and the county seat of Waukesha County
Waukesha (village), Wisconsin, a village in Waukesha County
Waukesha Dolomite, Waukesha County, Wisconsin, USA; a geologic formation
Waukesha Subdivision, Wisconsin, USA; a railroad division

Education
University of Wisconsin–Waukesha, Waukesha County, Wisconsin, USA
Waukesha County Technical College, Waukesha County, Wisconsin, USA
Waukesha School District, Waukesha County, Wisconsin, USA
Waukesha North High School
Waukesha South High School
Waukesha West High School

Businesses and organizations
Waukesha Engines, stationary engine brand
Waukesha Bearings Corporation
Milwaukee and Waukesha Railroad

Other uses
Waukesha Biota in the Lagerstätte of the Silurian from Waukesha Dolomite
, a U.S. Navy shipname
 , a WWII U.S.Navy Tolland-class attack cargo ship
Waukesha Christmas parade attack

See also

 
 Waukesha County (disambiguation)
 Waukesha High School (disambiguation)
 Waukesha attack (disambiguation)
"Wockesha", a similarly-titled song by rapper Moneybagg Yo